Joseph Schipfer (8 April 1761 – 27 January 1843) was a German landowner and wine producer, today mostly known for his creation of the language Communicationssprache. He was born in Ransbach.

Biography 
In his letter of 20 February 1840, titled "General Call to the Compassionate Humanity", Schipfer describes the suffering of the French inhabitants near the rivers Rhône and Saône and also provides a brochure on his "General Communication or World language (in German: Allgemeine Communications- oder Weltsprache)". Other brochures dealt with grammar and teaching materials for adults and children from 12 to 14 years of age.

In the same letter he wrote a description of how the live burial could be avoided and also made a proposal for general charity and that the profits from sales of his Communicationssprache materials be donated to the above-mentioned French populated areas.

References 

1761 births
1843 deaths
Linguists from Germany
Constructed language creators
Speakers of international auxiliary languages